3v3 Soccer is a variety of soccer played between two teams. Each team may only have three players on the field at a time (hence providing the name, "3 v 3", "3 versus 3", or "3 on 3"). This style of soccer is more commonly referred to as a "small-sided" game, as compared to a full-sided game with larger teams. The field used is smaller than a regulation soccer pitch, instead it typically is 30 yards wide by 40 yards long, although these dimensions vary quite a bit when the game is played indoors due to the varied styles and sizes of indoor pitches. It uses a much smaller goal than full-sided soccer. In most 3v3 there is no goalkeeper, although one variant, 3v3 Micro Soccer, does use a keeper.

"3v3 Soccer" is claimed to be the fastest growing form of soccer in the world. Its greatest popularity is in the United States, where hundreds and perhaps thousands of tournaments take place each year; moreover, it has also now begun to catch on in many other countries. Nike helped to popularize it with its international Joga3 Joga Bonito Tour in 2006, in which teams qualified at local events around the World, culminating in a big 3v3 World Cup played in Brazil.

3v3 is a much faster paced, and higher scoring game than traditional full-sided soccer. The speed of the attack, the use of triangulation, and the strategies bring aspects of hockey into the game. The quick shift from one end of the field to the other after a goal is scored, or upon loss of possession is reminiscent of basketball. It requires the blending of individual skills with teamwork.

The sport's gain in popularity is largely due to every member of the team getting equal playing time, and roughly equal touches on the ball. All players on the field are a part of the play. Because of the speed of the game, and the fact that players are constantly in motion, there are frequent substitutions. A typical player may be rotated on six times or more in one game. There are no permanently assigned positions as there are in full-sided soccer, giving each team member equal status and equal importance. This helps to develop individual skills.

Currently there are three major tours in the United States: Colorado based Kick it 3v3 Soccer with their World Championships held at the ESPN Wide World of Sports Complex in Florida; Utah-based 3v3 Live, and Florida-based Challenge3v3.

References 

Association football variants